Donato Sabia (11 September 1963 – 7 April 2020) was an Italian middle-distance runner who specialized in the 800 metres.

Biography
Donato Sabia was born in Potenza and won two medals, at senior level, at the International athletics competitions, one of these with national relay team. He participated at two editions of the Summer Olympics (1984, 1988), reaching, in both cases, the Olympic 800 metres final; he had 17 caps in national team from 1982 to 1988.

His personal best time was 1:43.88 minutes, achieved in June 1984 in Florence. In the 400 metres he had 45.73 seconds, achieved in June 1984 in Milan.

Donato Sabia died on 7 April 2020, in San Carlo Hospital, in Potenza, from COVID-19, having on 31 March 2020 also lost his father to the same disease. He was 56.

Achievements

National titles
Sabia won six individual national championships.
1 win in the 400 metres (1984)
3 wins in the 800 metres (1983, 1984, 1988)
2 wins in the 400 metres indoor (1983, 1988)

See also
 Italian all-time lists - 800 metres
 Italy national relay team

References

External links
 

1963 births
2020 deaths
Italian male middle-distance runners
Italian male sprinters
Athletes (track and field) at the 1984 Summer Olympics
Athletes (track and field) at the 1988 Summer Olympics
Olympic athletes of Italy
People from Potenza
Sportspeople from the Province of Potenza
World Athletics Championships athletes for Italy
Mediterranean Games silver medalists for Italy
Mediterranean Games medalists in athletics
Athletes (track and field) at the 1983 Mediterranean Games
Deaths from the COVID-19 pandemic in Basilicata
Italian Athletics Championships winners